Qaleh Juq (also Romanized as Qal‘eh Juq and Qal‘eh-ye Jūq) is a village in Razliq Rural District of the Central District of Sarab County, East Azerbaijan province, Iran. At the 2006 National Census, its population was 2,185 in 568 households. The following census in 2011 counted 2,205 people in 658 households. The latest census in 2016 showed a population of 2,129 people in 664 households; it was the largest village in its rural district.

References 

Sarab County

Populated places in East Azerbaijan Province

Populated places in Sarab County